The Austrian Futsal Liga is the premier  futsal league in Austria. It was founded in 2002. The league is played under UEFA rules and organized by Austrian Football Association, currently consists of 12 teams. From 2002 - 2005 the champion was crowned at a final tournament with prior qualification tournaments. From 2006 - 2009 the Austrian Futsal League was governed by Austria Futsal. From the 2010-11' season onwards the championship is governed by the  Austrian Football Association.

Winning clubs

Results by team

All-time AUSTRIAN FUTSAL LEAGUE TABLE
Seasons 2006/07 - 2020/21

Updated at completion of 2020–21 season.

League or status at 2020–21 season:

External links
Austrian Football Association
Futsalplanet 
Futsal in Austria

Futsal competitions in Austria
Austria
Futsal
2002 establishments in Austria
Sports leagues established in 2002
Professional sports leagues in Austria